The Hundred Flowers Award for Best Actor was first awarded by the China Film Association in 1962.

Winners & nominations

1960s

1980–2004

Since 2006

Records

Multiple awards for Best Actor
3 awards
 Ge You
2 awards
 Yang Zaibao
 Li Rentang
 Jiang Wen
 Gu Yue

Multiple awards for Best Actor and Best Supporting Actor combined
4 awards
 Ge You (Three awards for Best Actor, one award for Best Supporting Actor)

3 awards
 Ge You (Three awards for Best Supporting Actor)

2 awards
 Yang Zaibao (Two awards for Best Actor)
 Li Rentang (Two awards for Best Actor)
 Jiang Wen (Two awards for Best Actor)
 Li Baotian (One awards for Best Actor, one award for Best Supporting Actor)
 Gu Yue (Two awards for Best Actor)
 Sun Feihu (Two awards for Best Supporting Actor)

References

Hundred Flowers, Best Actor
Actor
Film awards for lead actor